Rudłowo  is a village in the administrative district of Gmina Braniewo, within Braniewo County, Warmian-Masurian Voivodeship, in northern Poland, close to the border with the Kaliningrad Oblast of Russia.  The village has a population of 288.

Location 

Latitude-54° 22' 12" N

Longitude-19° 49' 59" E

References

Villages in Braniewo County